Montréal-Est was a former provincial electoral district in the Montreal region of Quebec, Canada that elected members to the Legislative Assembly of Quebec.

It was created for the 1867 election.  Its final election was in 1886.  It disappeared in the 1890 election and its successor electoral districts were Montréal division no. 1, Montréal division no. 2 and Montréal division no. 3.

Members of the Legislative Assembly
 George-Étienne Cartier, Conservative (1867–1871)
 Ferdinand-Conon David, Conservative (1871–1875)
 Louis-Olivier Taillon, Conservative (1875–1886)
 Laurent-Olivier David, Liberal (1886–1890)

References
 Election results (National Assembly)
 Election results (QuebecPolitique.com)

Former provincial electoral districts of Quebec